Fritz Moravec (27 April 1922 – 17 March 1997) was an Austrian mountaineer and author. He is best known for his numerous expeditions in the Karakoram range, where he participated in the first ascent of Gasherbrum II (8,034 m, 26,358 ft). Moravec was the founder of the Glockner-Kaprun mountaineering school.

Life
Fritz Moravec was born on 27 April 1922 in the Favoriten tenth district of Vienna, Austria. After an apprenticeship as a motor mechanic, he studied mechanical engineering at the Technical University of Vienna. He developed a love of mountaineering from his father, a locomotive engineer, who served as a military mountain guide in the Dolomites during World War I. I 1942, Moravec served in one of the mountain units in the Caucasus during World War II. 

After returning to Austria after the war in 1946, Moravec continued to study psychology and education and became a teacher in a specialized school for locksmithing. He spent his spare time with youth groups in the mountains, as in the Gesäuse, and led climbing courses. Moravec specialized in ice climbing. After 1950, he began climbing in the Western Alps, and by 1954 he climbed for the first time in the Himalayas to Saipal.

On 7 July 1956 he ascended Gasherbrum II with Josef Larch and Hans Willenpart. In the coming years, he participated in numerous other expeditions to the Spitsbergen, Dhaulagiri, and to Africa. For some time, Moravec's ascent of Gasherbrum II was questioned because he was not visible in summit photos. On 25 September 1995, in a lecture on Himalayan mountaineering held at Vienna's City Hall, Moravec stated:

In 1959, Moravec led an Austrian expedition to Dhaulagiri. As the team approached the summit on 27 May 1959, they were forced to turn back due to poor weather conditions—a mere 300 m from their goal. Although the summit attempt failed, Moravec's team prepared the way and identified the route on the northeast ridge that would be used by the Swiss expedition the following year.

In 1962, Moravec was approached to participate in a Dutch Himalayan expedition. At the same time, he was approached by naturalists who wanted him to build a climbing school. Moravec chose the latter project, and soon founded the Glockner-Kaprun mountaineering school and remained its leader for thirty years. He created training programs for ten to thirteen-year-olds which are still recognized worldwide. 

Moravec died on 17 March 1997 in Vienna. He was buried in Hietzinger cemetery. Following his death, his mountaineering school was renamed the Fritz Moravec High Mountain School in his honour.

Works
 Weiße Berge: schwarze Menschen, 1958
 Dhaulagiri: Berg ohne Gnade, 1960
 Gefahren und Gefährten, 1961

Awards
 Karl Renner Prize, awarded on December 13, 1956

See also
 List of Austrian mountain climbers

References

External links
 Hochgebirgsschule  

1922 births
1997 deaths
20th-century Austrian people
Austrian mountain climbers
Austrian people of Czech descent
People from Favoriten
Sportspeople from Vienna